32 Leaves was an American rock band from Phoenix, Arizona. After releasing their first full album Welcome to the Fall in 2005, they were able to attract major label support from Universal Records. However, plans fell through and they ended up releasing their second album, Panoramic, independently on March 15, 2009.

History

Formation and Fik'shen EP (2001–2004)
The band formed in 2001 and played locally in Arizona for their first few years. Their first formal release of music was in 2003 with the Fik'shen EP.  The EP had five tracks; the first three tracks, "Overflow", "Makeshift", and "Sudden Change", would later be reworked and re-recorded for their 2005 LP, Welcome to the Fall. The other two tracks, "Bruised and Break" and "Dissolved", had a different, softer sound than the majority of the of their work, and were never reworked. Additionally, the track "Interlude to Addiction",  from Welcome to the Fall, is also on the EP, but as an intro to "Makeshift" rather than a separate track itself.

Welcome to the Fall (2005–2006)
In 2005, 32 Leaves recorded and mixed their debut album Welcome to the Fall with Larry "Love" Elyea of Bionic Jive fame, at The Salt Mine and Mind's Eye Digital. The album included artwork from friend and artist Jon McLaughlin (not the singer from Indiana) inside the album jacket.

In the same year, they also contributed a cover of The Smashing Pumpkins song "Zero" for The Killer in You: A Tribute to Smashing Pumpkins.

Welcome to the Fall was released on September 6, 2005, on Double Blind records, a minor record label. In the following years, the band supported the album and toured with such acts as 10 Years, Crossfade, Dredg, Evans Blue, Fair to Midland, Smile Empty Soul, and Trapt.

Panoramic (2007–2009)
Due to the extensive touring in support of Welcome to the Fall, they were able to attract the support of a major record label, Universal Records. 32 Leaves recorded two singles, a new version of "All Is Numb" and new song "Way Beyond", in October 2007, collaborating with famed producer Elvis Basquette. The band released the songs on iTunes shortly thereafter, as a preview of what they were working on.

Not much was heard from the band until December 2008, when a number of things occurred. First, it became known that the band had parted ways with Universal Records. Despite this, they were still determined to release their music, as they decided to continue without the support of a major record company. The band converted a three-story house into a recording studio, with singer Greg Norris engineering. The band spent five months writing and recording. It has been reported that turmoil within the group began mid-process of these "house sessions". The band completed the record in December 2008. In an online interview Greg Norris stated that "the Universal Records experience was not what we were accustomed to, we had day to day contact with the smaller label, I didn't talk to any Universal people at all".

32 Leaves previewed a new song on their MySpace, titled "Sideways".  It was a rough mix of a song for the new album. It was said to be the first song they recorded after completing their 2005 CD Welcome to the Fall.  They also had plans to preview one more "rough mix" from the album that month, but those plans fell through. However, the following month they streamed the album version of the track "Human".

Lastly, at the end of the month, they announced that the album had been entitled Panoramic, inspired by a photo that was included in the rear-panel artwork for the record. The album was released March 15, 2009. The album art features a large black beetle crawling on a green leaf. Signed- copy pre-orders shipped one or two weeks before. The band had the freedom to do this with releasing the album independently. The track listing showed that the new version of "All Is Numb" was cut from the release, and that the version of "Way Beyond" was an alternate version than the 2007 release, both confirmed with the album's actual release.

While the band toured some in 2009 in support of the album, they disbanded amicably in 2010.

In January 2020, the band reunited and played a concert in an Arizona club Last Exit Live.

Former members
 Greg Allen Norris − vocals
 Mike Lopez − guitar
 Mike Chavez − guitar
 Aron Orosz − bass
 Trey Thompson – drums
 Barrett Gardner − drums

Discography

Albums
 Fik'shen [EP] (2003)
 Welcome to the Fall (2005)
 Panoramic (2009)

Singles
 "All Is Numb" (2005)
 "Blood on My Hands" (2005)
 "Never Even There" (2005)
 "Way Beyond" (2007)
 "Human" (2009)

Side projects
 Greg Norris has provided vocals on Kevin Matisyn's song "Bad Times".
 Norris also produced Parabelle's double-album A Summit Borderline/A Drop Oceanic.
 , lead singer Greg Norris is in a new band called Codec. Codec released an EP in early 2012. They then released a full-length album, Horizontime on November 30, 2012, which included all five songs from the EP and nine new tracks.
 In 2015, former members Greg Norris, Mike Lopez and Barrett Gardner started a new band, M.E.N.D. They released their debut EP, Prisms on December 10, 2016, which was recorded with Cory Spotts of Bluelight Audio Media.
 In December 2017, Greg Norris formed the band Retina  with band members Chris Bedan, Ken Hoyt, and Scott Root. They released their self-titled EP in August 2018 which contains six tracks, and most recently released a single "Winters Return" on December 10, 2019.

References

External links
 MySpace site
 32 Leaves at Cage Rattle

American post-grunge musical groups
Musical groups from Phoenix, Arizona
Musical groups established in 2001
Musical quintets
2001 establishments in Arizona
Rock music groups from Arizona